Brigadier Charles Calveley Foss,  (9 March 1885 – 9 April 1953) was an English recipient of the Victoria Cross (VC), the highest and most prestigious award for gallantry in the face of the enemy that can be awarded to British and Commonwealth forces. A professional soldier in the British Army, he was awarded the VC in 1915 for his actions during the Battle of Neuve Chapelle.

Early life
Charles Foss was born on 9 March 1885 in Kobe, Japan. His father, Reverend Hugh James Foss, was the Bishop of Osaka. His mother, from Chester, died when he was around the age of nine. He was educated in England, where he attended Marlborough College. In 1904, he was commissioned into the British Army's Bedfordshire Regiment having spent the two years prior at Royal Military Academy at Sandhurst in Berkshire. Posted to the regiment's 2nd Battalion, in 1912 he was promoted to captain.

First World War
On the outbreak of the First World War, Foss was serving in South Africa as adjutant of his battalion. The battalion was shortly dispatched to the Western Front, arriving at Zeebrugge in early October 1914, as part of the 21st Brigade, 7th Division, and fought in the First Battle of Ypres later that month. By the time of the battalion's withdrawal from the frontline in early November, he was the senior surviving frontline officer. The following year he was awarded the Distinguished Service Order (DSO) in recognition of his service at Ypres.

In early March 1915, the 7th Division was tasked with a role in the Battle of Neuve Chapelle. Foss' battalion advanced to the northwest of Neuve Chapelle on the opening day of the battle, 10 March, in support of the Royal Scots Fusiliers to the east. They held their position for the following day but on 12 March the neighbouring Royal Scots Fusiliers had to fend off an attack on their trenches by the Germans. A section of their trenches were lost. Foss led a group of men with handheld bombs on a flanking raid and was able to recapture the lost trench. It was during this raid that he performed the deed for which he was awarded the Victoria Cross (VC). The VC, instituted in 1856, was the highest award for valour that could be bestowed on a soldier of the British Empire. The citation reads as follows:

Of the men who accompanied Foss during his attack, several were recognised with gallantry decorations; one, Private William Eade, was awarded the Distinguished Conduct Medal and the Order of St George. Sergeant William Peggs was also awarded the Order of St George while a third man, Private Walter Scrivener, killed the day after Foss's action, was mentioned in despatches.

The 2nd Battalion was withdrawn from the frontline on 14 March. Later in the year Foss was married to Vere Katherine , the widow of an Indian Army officer. By the time of the gazetting of his VC, Foss was serving as the brigade major of the Bedfordshire Regiment. While King George V was on an inspection tour of the 7th Division on 28 October 1915, he presented the VC to Foss.

Shortly afterwards Foss was appointed a staff officer at 20th Brigade. At the end of the year, he was mentioned in despatches, the first of five such mentions during the course of the war. Later, having been promoted to major, he was on the staff of the 2nd, then 1st Canadian Divisions, and finally the Canadian Corps. During this time he was awarded the Order of Danilo 4th Class (Montenegro). In 1918, he instructed at a staff school in Cambridge before returning to the Western Front shortly before the end of the war with a British infantry corps.

Later life
At the conclusion of hostilities, Foss was promoted to brevet lieutenant colonel and appointed chief of staff at the 57th Division and remained in this position into 1919, at which time he went to the Staff College at Camberley for further training. He graduated the following year. He spent five years at the War Office before being given command of the King's Liverpool Regiment. In 1933 he was promoted to colonel and posted to Burma as commander of the Rangoon Brigade Area. He was also appointed as aide-de-camp to King George V. He was appointed a Companion of the Order of the Bath (CB) in the 1937 New Year Honours. He retired the same year having achieved the rank of brigadier.

During the Second World War, he was a member of the home guard in Bedfordshire and also commandant of the Bedfordshire Army Cadet Force. In 1943 he was appointed a deputy lieutenant of Bedfordshire. He died on 9 April 1953 in London, survived by his second wife who he had married in 1950. His first wife had died in 1947. He is buried in West Hill Cemetery at Winchester in Hampshire.

Medals
Foss' medals, which in addition to the VC, CB and DSO, included the 1914 Star with Mons clasp, the British War Medal, Victory Medal with Mentioned in Despatches oak leaf, Defence Medal, War Medal 1939–1945, George VI Coronation Medal and the Order of Danilo 4th Class (Montenegro) are displayed at the Bedfordshire and Hertfordshire Regimental Gallery at the Wardown Park Museum in Luton, Bedfordshire.

Notes

References

External links

Location of grave and VC medal (Hampshire)
 

1885 births
1953 deaths
Burials in Hampshire
Bedfordshire and Hertfordshire Regiment officers
British Army personnel of World War I
British Home Guard officers
British Army recipients of the Victoria Cross
British World War I recipients of the Victoria Cross
Companions of the Distinguished Service Order
Companions of the Order of the Bath
Graduates of the Royal Military College, Sandhurst
People from Kobe
Deputy Lieutenants of Bedfordshire
British Army brigadiers
Graduates of the Staff College, Camberley